Boron fluoride can refer to:

 Boron monofluoride, a gas stable only at very low temperatures
 Boron trifluoride, a stable gas
 Diboron tetrafluoride (B2F4) gas, boils at −34 Celsius